Ian James Walker (born 25 February 1970 in Worcester, Worcestershire) is one of Britain's most successful sailors, with two Olympic silver medals to his name.  He is a member of Northampton Sailing Club and Warsash Sailing Club.

Olympics

At the 1996 Summer Olympics in Savannah, Walker received the silver medal in the 470 class along with his sailing partner, John Merricks. At the 1996 470-European-Sailing-Championship he won with his Partner John Merricks the bronze medal. On 15 October 1997, both Walker and Merricks were passengers in a minivan in Italy when the driver lost control, and Merricks was killed.

In 1999, Walker began sailing with Mark Covell. At the 2000 Summer Olympics in Sydney, Walker and Covell won the silver medal in the Star class.

Walker also coached Shirley Robertson and her Yngling Team to gold at the 2004 Athens Olympics.

America Cup 

When Britain launched its first bid for the America’s Cup for 14 years in 2000, Walker was named as the skipper. Then, in the 2007 America’s Cup he joined fellow Olympic medallist Iain Percy as the tactician of the Italian team +39 Challenge. His America’s Cup commitments were combined with the highly successful TP52 campaign as skipper of 'Patches', owned by Eamon Conneely.

Volvo Ocean Race

2008/09 Race 
In 2008/09 he was the skipper of the Green Dragon boat in the Volvo Ocean Race., the boat finished fifth in this race out of eight competitors.

2011/12 Race 
In 2011/12 Walker skippered Abu Dhabi's first entry in the Volvo Ocean Race – Abu Dhabi Ocean Racing. Overall the team finished fifth out of the six competitors.

2014/15 Race 
Ian was appointed as Skipper of Abu Dhabi's next entry into the Volvo Ocean Race, sailing the new VO65 class. He successfully lead the team to victory, securing an insurmountable point lead over the other teams on the second to last leg. During this race the team also won the in-port race series and set a 24-hour distance record of 550.82 nautical miles while approaching Cape Horn.

Records held 
 Fastest circumnavigation – Isle of Wight – 2 hours 21 minutes (Foncia) August 2012. Ratified by the World Sailing Speed Record Council
 Fastnet Monohull Race record – 42hrs 39min, (Volvo Open 70 Abu Dhabi) in August 2011

References

External links
 
 Green Dragon Racing Team
 Interview with Ian Walker, Green Dragon skipper, May 2009
 Abu Dhabi Ocean Racing 2011-12

1970 births
Living people
Sportspeople from Worcester, England
English male sailors (sport)

Olympic sailors of Great Britain
Sailors at the 1996 Summer Olympics – 470
Sailors at the 2000 Summer Olympics – Star
Olympic silver medallists for Great Britain
Olympic medalists in sailing
Medalists at the 2000 Summer Olympics
Medalists at the 1996 Summer Olympics

2007 America's Cup sailors
2003 America's Cup sailors
2000 America's Cup sailors

Volvo Ocean Race sailors

International 14 world champions
World champions in sailing for Great Britain